Shah Viran-e Bala (also Romanized as Shāh Vīrān-e Bālā; also known as Shāh Vīrān-e ‘Olyā) is a village in Hemmatabad Rural District, in the Central District of Borujerd County, Lorestan Province, Iran. At the 2006 census, its population was 83, in 18 families.

References 

Towns and villages in Borujerd County